Warren Holmes (born February 18, 1957) is a Canadian former professional hockey player who played for the Los Angeles Kings of the National Hockey League, as well as a number of American Hockey League and International Hockey League teams. 

Holmes was born in Beeton, Ontario. Holmes has two daughters, born in 1988 and 1991. He currently resides in Houston, Texas, USA.

Career statistics

External links

1957 births
Houston Apollos players
Living people
Los Angeles Kings draft picks
Los Angeles Kings players
Milwaukee Admirals (IHL) players
New Haven Nighthawks players
Ottawa 67's players
Ice hockey people from Simcoe County
Springfield Indians players
Winnipeg Jets (WHA) draft picks
Canadian ice hockey centres